MacCormick Fjord is a fjord in northern Greenland. To the southwest, the fjord opens into the Murchison Sound of the Baffin Bay.

History
In 1891 a spot in the southern shore near the mouth of the fjord was chosen as a place for the recovery of Robert Peary during his Second Greenland Expedition. A house was built and the site was named "Red Cliff".

Geography
MacCormick Fjord, together with Robertson Fjord close to the west, is one of the two main indentations of the northern side of the Murchison Sound. It runs in a roughly NE/SW direction east of Cape Robertson, with its mouth north of Cape Cleveland, beyond the western end of the Inglefield Gulf. Piulip Nunaa is the peninsula that separates this fjord from Bowdoin Fjord to the east and MacCormick Fjord forms the peninsula's western coastline. Most of the fjord's shores are beach.

See also
List of fjords of Greenland

References

External links
Greenland Institute of Natural Resources - Grønlands Naturinstitut

Fjords of Greenland